Maria Sander (30 October 1924 in Dinslaken – 12 January 1999 in Much) was a German athlete who was born as Maria Domagala. She mainly competed in the 100 metres.

She competed for West Germany in the 1952 Summer Olympics held in Helsinki, Finland in the 4 x 100 metres where she won the silver medal with her team mates Ursula Knab, Helga Klein and Marga Petersen.  In the same meeting she also ran in the 80 metre hurdles, winning the bronze medal.

References

1924 births
1999 deaths
Athletes (track and field) at the 1952 Summer Olympics
Athletes (track and field) at the 1956 Summer Olympics
European Athletics Championships medalists
Medalists at the 1952 Summer Olympics
Olympic athletes of the United Team of Germany
Olympic athletes of Germany
Olympic bronze medalists for Germany
Olympic bronze medalists in athletics (track and field)
Olympic silver medalists for Germany
Olympic silver medalists in athletics (track and field)
West German female sprinters
Olympic female sprinters